Scripophily is the study and collection of stock and bond certificates. A specialized field of numismatics, scripophily has developed as an area of collecting because of the inherent beauty of certain historical certificates, and because of the interesting historical context of many of the documents. In addition, some stock certificates serve as excellent examples of engraving. Occasionally, an old stock certificate is found that still has value as actual shares in the original or a successor company.

History

Scripophily, the collecting of old stocks and bonds, gained recognition as a hobby around 1970. The word "scripophily" was coined by combining words from English and Greek. The word "scrip" represents an ownership right and the word "philos" means to love.

Today, there are thousands of collectors worldwide (Scripophilists) in search of scarce, rare, and popular stock and bond certificates. Whether they are private investors or a variety of different types of businesspeople, many collectors enjoy scripophily as a hobby, while many others also consider it a good form of investment.

Many collectors appreciate the historical significance of old certificates. Others prefer the beauty of older stock and bond certificates that were printed in various colors with fancy artwork and ornate engravings. In recent times, certificates issued by dot-com companies and companies involved in scandals have become particularly popular amongst Scripophilists.

A recent addition to the hobby of Scripophily is collecting real, live shares issued in one's name. Common companies that issue personalized stock certificates include The Walt Disney Company, Harley-Davidson, McDonald's, Starbucks, Google, Ford Motor Company, The Coca-Cola Company, and Berkshire Hathaway. Framing is a popular option for these certificates.

Many autograph collectors engage in Scripophily, looking for certificates signed by historic or well-known figures, such as stock certificates issued by Standard Oil Company and signed by John D. Rockefeller, Franklin Fire Insurance Company and signed by Henry Charles Carey, Ringling Brothers and Barnum & Bailey Circus, Atari Corporation, Eastern Air Lines and signed by Eddie Rickenbacker when he served as the company's president, Tucker Corporation, and many others.

As a hobby

A large part of scripophily is the area of financial history. Over the years there have been millions of companies which needed to raise money for their business. In order to do so, the founders of these companies issued securities. Generally speaking, they either issued an equity security in the form of stock or a debt security in the form of a bond. However, there are many varieties of equity and debt instruments. They can be common stock, preferred stock, warrants, cumulative preferred stocks, bonds, zero-coupon bonds, long term bonds (over 15 years) and any combination thereof.

Each certificate is a piece of history about a company and its business. Some companies became major successes, while others were acquired and merged with other companies. Some companies and industries were successful until they were replaced by new technologies. Some companies have been the center of scandal or fraud. The color, paper, signatures, dates, stamps, cancellations, borders, pictures, vignettes, industry, stockbroker, name of company, transfer agent, printer, and holder name all add to the uniqueness of the hobby.

A lot of companies either were never successful or went bankrupt, so that their certificates became worthless pieces of paper until the hobby of scripophily began. The mining boom in the 1850s, railroad construction in the 1830s, the oil boom in the 1870s, telegraphy (1850s), the automobile industry beginning around 1900, aviation (around 1910), electric power and banks in the 1930s, the airline wars and mergers in the 1970s, cellular telephones (1980s), long distance telephone service in the 1980s and 1990s, and most recently the Dot-com era and Enron all resulted in historically significant certificates being generated and issued.

Today, more stocks and bonds are issued electronically, meaning fewer paper certificates are issued as a percentage of actual stock issued. The Internet has played a dramatic role in raising awareness of the hobby. A number of websites now exist that sell old stocks and bonds to include scripophily.com and oldstocks.com.

Guidelines

There are many factors that determine value of a certificate. These include condition, age, historical significance, signatures, rarity, demand for the item, aesthetics, type of company, original face value, bankers associated with issuance, transfer stamps, cancellation markings, issued or unissued, printers, and type of engraving process.

Condition - The grading scale that could be used in stocks and bonds is shown below. Generally speaking, however, the grading is not used in the hobby as strictly as it is in coins and stamps. Most people acquire certificates for the artwork and history.

 Uncirculated - Looks like new, no abnormal markings or folds, no staples, clean signature and no stains
 Extremely Fine - Slight traces of wear
 Very Fine - Minor traces of wear
 Fine - Creased with clear signs of use and wear
 Fair - Strong signs of use and wear
 Poor - Some damage with heavy signs of wear and staining

Age - Usually the older, the more valuable, but not always.

Historical significance - What product did the company produce? Was it the first car, airplane, cotton gin, etc. Was the company successful? Was it a fraud? In what era (i.e. during a war, depression, revolution) was the item issued?

Signatures - Did anyone famous or infamous sign the certificate?

Cross Collecting Themes - Sports, finance, automotive, and railroad enthusiast interest.

Newsworthy - Some companies that are in the news (good or bad).

Certificate Owner's Name - Was the certificate issued to anyone famous or to a famous company?

Rarity - How many of the certificates were issued? How many survived over the years? Is the certificate a low number?

Demand for Item - How many people are trying to collect the same certificate?

Aesthetics - How does the certificate look? What is in the vignette? What color of ink was used? Does it have fancy borders or writing on it?

Type of company - What type of company was it issued for? Does the industry still exist? Has the industry changed a lot over the years?

Original Face Value - How much was the stock or bond issued for? Usually, the larger the original face value, the more collectible it is.

Bankers associated with Issuance - Who worked on the fund raising efforts? Was it someone famous or a famous bank? Is the bank still in existence?

Transfer Stamps - Does the certificate have tax stamps on it? Are the stamps imprinted or attached? Are the stamps valuable or unusual?

Cancellation Markings - Are the cancellation markings interesting to the item? Do they detract or add to its history and looks?

Issued or Unissued - Was the item issued or unissued? Was the certificate a printer's prototype usually stamped with the word "specimen"? Usually, issued certificates are more valuable and desirable.

Printers - Who printed the certificate? Was it a famous printer?

Type of Engraving Process - How was the certificate made - By hand? By wood engraving? Steel engraving? Lithograph? Preprinted form?

Paper - Was the paper used in the printing high-quality or low-quality? Has it held up over time? Does it have a watermark to prevent counterfeiting?

Scripophily market indices
Due to historical nature of collecting, it makes no sense to track scripophily market using stock market indices like S&P 500 Index, Dow Jones Industrial Average or others. However, apart from real time quotes there is a way to do so half-yearly based on the records of three major European market players. These records cover all relevant auction results for 100 selected items, being significant for the worldwide Scripophily market:
 HSTM Historic Stocks Market Index

See also

Stock certificate

Notes

References

Further reading

External links

IBSS International Bond & Share Society
About the Hobby of Collecting Old Stocks and Bonds
Old Stock Exchange - Examples of Old Stock and Bond Certificates
Scripozine Scripophily magazine (PDF, free of charge)
Museo digitale della Scripofilia - Digital Museum of Scripophily
Professional Scripophily Traders Association

Numismatics
Securities (finance)

de:Historische Wertpapiere
lt:Nonvaleurs